Abbey School is a mixed special school for children with moderate and complex learning difficulties. It is located in Kimberworth, South Yorkshire, England.

Abbey School was opened in September 1994, and was originally administered by Rotherham Metropolitan Borough Council. The school was converted to academy status in June 2016 and is now part of the Nexus Multi-Academy Trust. However the school continues to coordinate with Rotherham Metropolitan Borough Council for admissions.

Ofsted inspections
Since opening in 1994, the school has undergone seven Ofsted inspections:

References

External links
 Abbey School official website

Special schools in Rotherham
Educational institutions established in 1994
1994 establishments in England
Academies in Rotherham